Bijarkan (also Romanized as Bījārkan; also known as Bījār Kan) is a village in Ziabar Rural District, in the Central District of Sowme'eh Sara County, Gilan Province, Iran. At the 2006 census, its population was 201, in 42 families.

References 

Populated places in Sowme'eh Sara County